Jean Emery was a Swiss basketball player. He competed for the Switzerland men's national basketball team during the EuroBasket 1953 tournament.

References

Possibly living people
Swiss men's basketball players
Place of birth missing